André-Samuel-Michel Cantwell (1744–1802) was a French translator.

1744 births
1802 deaths
French translators
French librarians
French male non-fiction writers
18th-century French translators